In mathematics, the Casas-Alvero conjecture is an open problem about polynomials which have factors in common with their derivatives, proposed by Eduardo Casas-Alvero in 2001.

Formal statement
Let f be a polynomial of degree d defined over a field K of characteristic zero.  If f has a factor in common with each of its derivatives f(i), i = 1, ..., d − 1, then the conjecture predicts that f must be a power of a linear polynomial.

Analogue in non-zero characteristic
The conjecture is false over a field of characteristic p: any inseparable polynomial f(Xp) without constant term satisfies the condition since all derivatives are zero.  Another, separable,  counterexample is Xp+1 − Xp

Special cases
The conjecture is known to hold in characteristic zero for degrees of the form pk or 2pk where p is prime and k is a positive integer. Similarly, it is known for degrees of the form 3pk where p ≠ 2, for degrees of the form 4pk where
p ≠ 3, 5, 7, and for degrees of the form 5pk where p ≠ 2, 3, 7, 11, 131, 193, 599, 3541, 8009. Similar results are available for degrees of the form 6pk and 7pk.  It has recently been established for d = 12, making d = 20 the smallest open degree.

References

 
 
 
 
 

Conjectures
Unsolved problems in number theory